Czysta  (German: Wittbeck) is a village in the administrative district of Gmina Smołdzino, within Słupsk County, Pomeranian Voivodeship, in northern Poland.

The village has a population of 163.

References

Czysta